This Is Life (Danish: Det gælder livet) is a 1953 Danish film directed by Jon Iversen and starring Poul Müller, Lisbeth Movin and Elsebet Knudsen.

Cast
 Poul Müller as Arkitekt Olaf Henningsen 
 Lisbeth Movin as Ella Henningsen  
 Elsebet Knudsen as Lotte Henningsen  
 Hans Kurt as Fabrikant Viggo Thomsen  
 Signi Grenness as Polly Thomsen  
 Henning Moritzen as Sanglærer Stefan Korsby  
 Henrik Wiehe as Kurt Rosing  
 Preben Uglebjerg as Kurts ven  
 Kjeld Jacobsen as Henningsens læge  
 Tavs Neiiendam as Rektor  
 Johannes Meyer as Vagtmester Madsen  
 Ove Rud as Hospitalslæge  
 Axel Strøbye as Mekaniker 
 Povl Wøldike as Tilskuer ved jubilæumsfest  
 Peter Kitter as Journalist

References

Bibliography 
 Morten Piil. Gyldendals danske filmguide. Gyldendal A/S, 2008.

External links 
 

1953 films
1950s Danish-language films
Films directed by Jon Iversen
Danish black-and-white films